Metehan Akyel (born July 9, 1996) is a Turkish professional basketball player who plays as Center for ONVO Büyükçekmece of the Basketbol Süper Ligi (BSL).

References

External links
Metehan Akyel Basketball Champions League Profile
Metehan Akyel TBLStat.net Profile
Metehan Akyel Eurobasket Profile
Metehan Akyel TBL Profile

Living people
1996 births
Bandırma B.İ.K. players
Büyükçekmece Basketbol players
Centers (basketball)
Gaziantep Basketbol players
Turkish men's basketball players